The 2012 Atlantic Coast Conference men's basketball tournament, part of the 2011–12 NCAA Division I men's basketball season, took place from March 8–11 at the Philips Arena in Atlanta. The Florida State Seminoles gave the state of Florida its first-ever ACC tournament win, capturing their first ACC championship in their 21st season in the league.

Seeding

Teams are seeded based on the final regular season standings, with ties broken under an ACC policy.

Schedule

Bracket

AP Rankings at time of tournament

Game summaries

References

-2012 ACC men's basketball tournament
ACC men's basketball tournament
College basketball tournaments in Georgia (U.S. state)
Basketball competitions in Atlanta
ACC men's basketball tournament
2012 in Atlanta
ACC men's basketball tournament